Chaos Theory is a 2008 American comedy-drama film starring Ryan Reynolds, Emily Mortimer, and Stuart Townsend. The film was directed by Marcos Siega, written by Daniel Taplitz and Kathy Gori, and was shot in Coquitlam and Squamish, British Columbia.

Plot 
Frank Allen is a professional speaker who lectures on time management. He lives by example: perfectly maximizing his efficiency through scheduling and planning his own life down to the minute. He dearly loves his wife, Susan, and their young daughter, Jesse.

On the day of an important seminar that could be his major break on the corporate lecture circuit, Susan changes their clocks by 10 minutes, to give him time to run a meaningless errand for her on this important day, but she moves them the wrong way. From missing the ferry to the career-damaging fact that he then arrives late to his lecture on time management, Frank experiences an off day. He loves his wife so much that, when the beautiful Paula crashes his hotel room, strips down and jumps on him, Frank excuses himself and heads home in the middle of the night.

While driving home through the night he sees a pregnant woman, Nancy, having contractions and gives the stranger a lift. At the hospital, Frank is asked to fill out some paper work. He mistakenly puts his own information down and the nurses at the hospital assume he is the father.

Before Frank arrives home, a nurse from the hospital calls attempting to reach "the father". Susan instantly believes it is Frank's baby and that he is cheating on her and leading a double life. When Frank arrives home, she refuses to let him clear up the misunderstanding and throws him out of the house within moments. Her reaction through the next few days remains over the top, refusing to talk to Frank and only allowing him to see Jesse after school.

Left with no choice but to provide scientific proof to Susan, Frank sees a doctor for a paternity test, but receives the diagnosis that he was never able to reproduce to begin with, since he has Klinefelter's syndrome. The undeniable truth about Jesse and, thus, Susan's own infidelity devastates Frank - but also explains why Susan so instantly presupposed that Frank was a cheater, treating him with unforgiving disdain and refusing to let him even try to clarify the situation.

A few days later, Nancy brings her baby to the Allens' house in hopes of thanking Frank for his kindness, finding only Susan at home. Nancy soon clears up the misunderstanding. Susan turns on a dime, ignoring her atrocious behaviour of the past few days and expecting Frank to simply come home, acting as if she is the one who has forgiven him. The damage is done, however, as Frank realizes that he was the only one in the relationship who was faithful, and goes through a withdrawal as he tries to comprehend how his daughter could not be his and how wrong his life turned out when he believed that he has always stayed straight and narrow.

After giving a life-changing speech about living on whim at his own time management lecture, he decides to live his life based on chance from that moment on. He starts his reformed outlook on life with the simple idea of possibility and randomness by basing his decisions on shuffling three index cards with written options and choosing one at random.

He goes on to have a one-night stand with the woman he met at the bar but he's too drunk to perform.

He realizes that Buddy is the father of his child and plots to kill Buddy. He lures him to the lake and try to kill him but they both fall into the lake and buddy saves Frank.

Buddy backs off and Frank realizes that he loves his family and forgives his wife and goes back to them.

In present-day the groom realizes that he loves the daughter and decides to get married.

Cast 
 Ryan Reynolds as Frank Allen
 Emily Mortimer as Susan Allen
 Stuart Townsend as Buddy Endrow
 Sarah Chalke as Paula Crowe
 Mike Erwin as Ed
 Constance Zimmer as Peg the Teacher
 Matreya Fedor as Jesse Allen (7 years)
 Elisabeth Harnois as Jesse Allen
 Chris William Martin as Damon
 Jovanna Huguet as Maid of Honor
 Christopher Jacot as Simon / Best Man
 Alessandro Juliani as Ken
 Jocelyne Loewen as Pregnant Nancy

Reception 

On Rotten Tomatoes, the film has an approval rating of 31% based on reviews from 59 critics. The site's critical consensus reads: "Ryan Reynolds and Emily Mortimer do what they can, but ultimately Chaos Theory is an overly conventional dramedy." On Metacritic, the film had a weighted average score of 44 out of 100, based on reviews from 18 critics, indicating "mixed or average reviews".

Dennis Harvey of Variety wrote: "The lead performers, the brighter fillips in Daniel Taplitz’s screenplay and Marcos Siega’s ("Pretty Persuasion") assured direction make this a pleasing item overall."
Michael Rechtshaffen of The Hollywood Reporter wrote: "The picture continuously shuffles moods like tunes on an iPod without ever making any lasting commitments."

Home media  
The DVD was released on June 17, 2008, in the US.

References

External links 
 
 
 

2008 films
2008 comedy-drama films
American comedy-drama films
Films directed by Marcos Siega
Films shot in Vancouver
Films about dysfunctional families
Warner Independent Pictures films
Castle Rock Entertainment films
2000s English-language films
2000s American films